The Creeping Flesh is a 1973 British horror film directed by Freddie Francis, written by Peter Spenceley, and starring Christopher Lee, Peter Cushing, and Lorna Heilbron.

Plot

Prof. Emmanuel Hildern (Peter Cushing), a Victorian era scientist, is shown meeting a young doctor in what appears to be a laboratory. He excitedly tells the doctor that he needs help because he has discovered a form of evil that is real, a living being, and that he has unwittingly unleashed the evil thousands of years too soon. He then recounts how his discovery was made.

In a flashback, Hildern recounts his return in 1894 from an expedition to New Guinea where he discovered an abnormally large humanoid skeleton. Paradoxically, the skeleton is far older than previously recovered specimens, but also much more advanced. Hildern hopes the discovery will earn him the prestigious Richter Prize. He has little time to rejoice before receiving word that his wife, institutionalised for years, has finally died. He learns this from his brother James Hildern (Christopher Lee), who runs the asylum where Hildern's wife had been held in secret. While visiting the asylum, James tells his brother that he made a psychiatric study of Hildern's wife and plans to publish the findings in the hope of winning the Richter Prize. He also tells Hildern that he will no longer subsidise Hildern's expeditions.

Returning home and to the skeleton, and with a new urgency to complete his research, Hildern discovers that the skeleton grows flesh when exposed to water. Hildern reviews myths of ancient peoples of the region where the skeleton was discovered, which tell of evil giants who will be roused by rain. Hildern theorises that the skeleton is the remains of one of those evil beings, and would not have been discovered before for thousands of years of erosion revealed its resting place. By that time, the science of the region's inhabitants would have grown sophisticated enough to deal with the evil. Hildern draws a further conclusion - if evil can live as an organism, then it can be biologically contained and eradicated like a disease. Using cells formed around the skeleton's fleshy finger - which Hildern removes - he develops what he believes to be a serum against evil. Testing the serum on a monkey, Hildern notes positive results.

Meanwhile, Hildern's daughter Penelope (Lorna Heilbron) learns of her mother's death. Having been told for years that her mother was dead, Penelope reacts with shock when learning that her mother had been alive and institutionalised all that time. Worried that Penelope's emotional outburst may be a sign that she has inherited her mother's insanity, Hildern injects her with the serum.

The next day Hildern is shocked to see that the monkey has gone berserk, having gained the strength to escape from its cage and wreak havoc in the lab. Penelope has also left the house and made her way to the city, where she assaults several men at a tavern and then, when chased by the other patrons, murders another man at a warehouse. Because the dead man was himself an escapee from James Hildern's asylum, James has sent men to the city. There they apprehend Penelope and bring her to the asylum, where a blood test reveals the serum. James realises that his brother has experimented on Penelope, which could unleash a scandal should it become known to others. Given that James's experiments have stalled - threatening his own chances of winning the Richter Prize - James decides to steal his brother's research, including the skeleton.

James's thief carries the skeleton out of the lab and unwittingly exposes it to rain. When the carriage taking the skeleton overturns, the skeleton - now coming alive - escapes. Hildern tries to follow the carriage, but turns back when he sees an ominous cloaked figure nearby. Returning home, Hildern finds that the skeleton's fleshy finger has begun to move. Terrified, Hildern throws the finger into the fire. Soon, the creature, now encased in flesh but otherwise hollow, returns to Hildern's house and removes his finger, but spares his life.

Hildern finishes his account and the story returns to the lab seen at the beginning of the film, Hildern's lab is revealed to be a cell in his "brother's" asylum, and Hildern an apparent inmate there. The visiting physician consults with James, who scoffs at Hildern's claim to be related to James at all, or that Penelope - who is also being kept at the asylum, having gone completely insane - is Hildern's daughter. James finds it normal for his patients to want to identify with him, given that he is clearly an authority figure. James tells the doctor that the man claiming to be his brother had arrived there about the time that James won the Richter Prize. The camera returns to Hildern's cell, which no longer resembles a laboratory. A distraught Hildern pleads for someone to help him. The final shot is of Hildern's left hand, which is now missing a finger matching the one that he had removed from the skeleton.

It is left for the viewer to decide if Hildern's account was true or is merely the delusion of a madman.

Cast
Christopher Lee – Dr. James Hildern
Peter Cushing – Prof. Emmanuel Hildern
Lorna Heilbron – Penelope Hildern
Jenny Runacre – Marguerite Hildern
George Benson – Prof. Waterlow
Kenneth J. Warren – Charles Lenny
Duncan Lamont – Inspector
Harry Locke – Barman
Hedger Wallace – Dr. Perry
Michael Ripper – Carter 
 Catherine Finn – Emily
Robert Swann – Young Aristocrat
David Bailie – Young Doctor 
Maurice Bush – Karl
Tony Wright – Sailor
Marianne Stone – Female Assistant
Alexandra Dane – Whore
Larry Taylor – Warder #1
Martin Carroll – Warder #2
Dan Meaden – Lunatic
Sue Bond – Girl in Tavern

Production
Freddie Francis replaced Don Sharp as director at the last minute.

The Creeping Flesh was produced by Tigon British Film Productions, and directed by Freddie Francis. The film was released in the UK on 1 January 1973. According to Donato totaro, editor of the online film journal Offscreen, said, "The Creeping Flesh was made at the tail end of a productive five year run for producer Tony Tenser at Tigon pictures (the studio ran until 1985)."<ref name="donato">Donato Totaro, [https://offscreen.com/view/the_creeping_flesh The Creeping Flesh-Containing 'Evil'''], Volume 11, Issue 4 / April 2007</ref>

Filming locations
Thorpe House, Coldharbour Lane, Thorpe, Surrey, England (also the location for Craze, 1973)
Shepperton Studios, Shepperton, Surrey, England

Release
The film was released by Columbia Pictures to cinemas on 1 January 1973.

ReceptionThe Creeping Flesh has received both praise and criticism. The film, directed by Freddie Francis, starred two icons of British horror, Christopher Lee and Peter Cushing, and was filmed late in the cycle of British Gothic horror films that lasted from the late 1950s to the mid-1970s. The style of this film is similar to that of many films from Hammer Film Productions, but it has not achieved anything like the fame of Hammer's The Curse of Frankenstein or Dracula. According to Gary Susman, author and columnist of AOL Moviefone's blog, "you can read the whole thing as a satire, on Victorian sexual expression, dated science, and imperialism, but it's easiest just to sit back and scream at the elegant creepiness of Cushing and Lee or the awful spectacle of that wriggling finger."

Contemporary reviews
Donato Totaro, in his review of The Creeping Flesh for online film journal Offscreen'', opined: "Although The Creeping Flesh is unevenly paced in moments and contains a sometimes maligned plot, a close analysis reveals a film marked by an interesting use of parallel montage, subtle thematic meaning imparted in the mise en scène, and a possible social message submerged within the slightly ludicrous apocalyptic scenario, dealing with the suppression of women in Victorian England (it would be too much of a stretch to read this as feminist)."

Home media
“The Creeping Flesh” was released on US Blu-ray on 4 April 2017 by Mill Creek Entertainment, in a three film set called “Psycho Circus.” This set also includes the films “Brotherhood of Satan” and “Torture Garden.”

“The Creeping Flesh” was also released on UK DVD on 19 May 2004 by DD Home Entertainment, however this was soon withdrawn due to a rights dispute.

References

External links 
 
 

1973 films
British horror films
Films directed by Freddie Francis
1973 horror films
Columbia Pictures films
1970s English-language films
1970s British films